GSA (Global Storage Architecture) is a distributed file system created by IBM to replace the Andrew File System and the DCE Distributed File System.

External links
 GSA Presentation by Stanley Wood

Distributed file systems
Network file systems
Internet Protocol based network software